Mozilla Firefox 2 is a version of Firefox, a web browser released on October 24, 2006 by the Mozilla Corporation.

Firefox 2 uses version 1.8 of the Gecko layout engine for displaying web pages. The release contained many new features not found in Firefox 1.5, including improved support for Scalable Vector Graphics (SVG) and JavaScript 1.7, as well as user interface changes.

On March 22, 2006, the first alpha version of Firefox 2 (Bon Echo Alpha 1) was released. It featured Gecko 1.8.1 for the first time. Mozilla Firefox 2.0.0.20 is the final version to support Windows NT 4.0, Windows 98 and Windows Me, although it can run on Windows 95 and Windows NT 3.51 using tweaks. Mac OS X 10.5 support was added October 18, 2007 with version 2.0.0.8.

Firefox 2.0 featured updates to tabbed browsing environment, the extensions manager, the GUI, and the find, search, and software update engines; a new session restore feature; inline spell checking; and an anti-phishing feature which was implemented by Google as an extension, and later merged into the program itself.

Mozilla ended support for Firefox 2 on December 18, 2008.

Overview of changes
 Links default to open in a new tab. 
 Close button on every tab. 
 Inline spell checking for text boxes. 
 Session restoration after a browser crash.
 Search suggestion for Google and Yahoo!.
 New search plugin manager and add-on manager.
 Web feed previewing. 
 Bookmark microsummaries. 
 Updates to the extension system. 
 Support for Sherlock and OpenSearch. 
 Support for SVG text using svg:textPath.
 Built-in anti-phishing protection. 
 Search suggestions appear with search history in the search box for Google and Yahoo!.
 Support for client-side session and persistent storage.
 Improved feed support.
 A new NSIS-based installer.
 JavaScript 1.7. 
 Enhanced security and localization support for extensions.
 New Winstripe theme refresh: 
New navigation icons
URL bar refresh (New Go button attached to the URL bar)
Search bar refresh Tab bar refresh
Alltabs button (used to view a popup list of all tabs open)

Market adoption & usage of Firefox 2

As one article noted after the release of Firefox 2.0 in October 2006, "IE6 had the lion's share of the browser market with 77.22%. Internet Explorer 7 had climbed to 3.18%, while Firefox 2.0 was at 0.69%."

A Softpedia article, however, noted in July 2007 that "Firefox 2.0 has been also expanding its share constantly in spite of IE7. From just 0.69% in October 2006, Firefox 2.0 is now accounting for 11.07% of the market. Mozilla has even sacrificed version 1.5 of its open source browser for Firefox 2.0. With support cut at the end of June, Firefox 1.5 dropped to just 2.85%."

Firefox 2 began to lose notable market share to Firefox 3. Within 24 hours after its release, Firefox 3 usage rose from under 1% to over 3% according to Net Applications in that time period. Firefox 2 market share consistently dropped, eventually being surpassed by Firefox 3 in 2008 and Firefox 3.5 in 2009 in the general browser market as the Firefox version with the greatest share, and by early 2009 had dropped under 3 percent.

Release compatibility

End of Life

Firefox 2.x was end-of-lifed in December, 2008. With roughly 26 months of support, only Firefox 3.6 was supported longer. The Gecko 1.8.1 browser core continued to receive patches for projects such as Camino, K-Meleon, and SeaMonkey, even after official Firefox releases had ceased.

By 2011, the 1.8.1 core had become obsolete, as major websites dropped support for it by employing newer technologies for presentation and complex scripting. The latter can be resource-intensive with the older core, and users stuck with it should use NoScript to avoid problems with scripts that take too long to process (at the cost of losing some or all site features beyond basic functionality).

Services with large user bases have relegated browsers with the Gecko 1.8.1 rendering engine to using lightweight or mobile versions of their sites, alongside recommendations to upgrade the browser; while others only recommend to upgrade.

Nevertheless, there is still a very large number of websites that are freely usable and navigable with Firefox 2.0 or equivalents, alone because many of them must still support other older browsers, like Internet Explorer 6 or IE7.

Release history

See also
 Firefox early version history

References

External links
Mozilla Firefox homepage for end-users
Mozilla Firefox project page for developers
Mozilla EULA

2
2006 software
Free software programmed in C++
Gopher clients
History of web browsers
Linux web browsers
MacOS web browsers
POSIX web browsers
Unix Internet software
Windows web browsers
Software that uses XUL